Tottenham is a suburb in Melbourne, Victoria, Australia,  west of Melbourne's Central Business District, located within the City of Maribyrnong local government area.

It is bounded by Sunshine Road to the north, Sredna Street, Paramount Road and Tottenham Parade to the east, Geelong Road to the south and the Newport–Sunshine railway line.

Tottenham is mostly an industrial suburb, with the Olex Cable manufacturing facility one of the many industrial businesses located in Tottenham.

History

Tottenham Central Post Office opened on 1 May 1947. Tottenham East Post Office opened on 18 November 1935 and closed in 1973. A Tottenham R.A.A.F. Post Office was open from 1947 until 1957.

Transportation

Tottenham is serviced by the Tottenham railway station, which lies on the convergent point of the borders of West Footscray, Tottenham and Braybrook. It is a station on the Sunbury railway line.

See also
 City of Sunshine – Tottenham was previously within this former local government area.

References

Suburbs of Melbourne
Suburbs of the City of Maribyrnong